"Lookin' Boy" (also known as "Lookin' Ass Nigga") is a song by American hip hop group Hotstylz, released on May 13, 2008, as their commercial debut single. The song, which was produced by Southern hip hop producer Nitti, features vocals from fellow American rapper Yung Joc.

Background
The song is a game that derives from The Dozens, but instead replaces the classic "Your Mama" opening references, with quips ending with the closing reference "...lookin' boy", or "lookin' ass nigga" in the explicit version. The song was meant to be the lead single for their unreleased debut album.

Music video
The music video was released in May 2008. American reality television personality Midget Mac, from I Love New York 2 makes a cameo appearance in the video.

Controversy
In 2013, Detroit-based rapper Eminem sampled this song for his 2013 single "Rap God". The group claims that Eminem did not receive permission to use the sample, nor did he credit or compensate them. In November 2013, Hotstylz released a diss track towards Eminem titled "Rap Fraud", where they sample several of his songs and criticize him for not crediting them. In January 2015, TMZ reported Hotstylz were suing Eminem and Shady Records for the amount of $8 million, for using the 25 second sample of "Lookin' Boy" on his song "Rap God", without their permission. In March 2016, the lawsuit was dismissed as both parties reached a confidential settlement.

Cultural references
There are numerous references to famous celebrities and popular icons that go in this order:

Hilary Banks' fiancé Trevor proposing to her from The Fresh Prince of Bel-Air
Whoopi Goldberg
"Midnight Train to Georgia" by Gladys Knight & the Pips
Don Imus "nappy headed ho" controversy
K-Y Jelly
Morris Chestnut's death scene in Boyz n the Hood
Valtrex
LL Cool J (his role in In the House)
Penny getting whooped by her mother in Good Times
J. J. from Good Times
LL Cool J's I Need Love song
"1st of tha Month" by Bone Thugs-n-Harmony
"This Is Your Brain on Drugs" commercials
Comedian Bernie Mac's role in Life
The Weakest Link
The Chris Stokes/Raz-B sex scandal
Pepé Le Pew
Mike Tyson's response about biting Evander Holyfield

Minute Rice
Chris Rock's comedy routine
Cam'ron and Mase's Horse & Carriage single
Let Me Clear My Throat by DJ Kool
SpongeBob SquarePants
K-Swiss
Scooby-Doo
Michael Vick's dog fighting controversy
Clifton Powell's role in Next Friday
The fictional hair product "Soul Glo" from the movie Coming to America
David Ruffin
"Ain't Too Proud to Beg" by The Temptations
Young Joc's single It's Goin' Down
Tickle Me Elmo
"I Wish" by Skee-Lo
Pine-Sol
"The Song That Never Ends" from Lamb Chop's Play-Along
John Witherspoon's "Bang Bang Bang" catch phrase and his role in The Wayans Bros.

Remixes
There are several remixes and alternate versions of "Lookin' Boy" that feature:
Yung Joc and R. Kelly
Yung Joc and Bow Wow
Yung Joc and Cassidy
Yung Joc and Prezidential Candidates

On the R. Kelly remix there are references to:

Betty Boop
Shabba Ranks
Flavor Flav's catch phrase "yeah boy"
Tina Turner
RuPaul
Wilma Flintstone from The Flintstones
Three 6 Mafia's "It's Hard out Here for a Pimp"
Elmer Fudd

On The Cassidy freestyle there are references to:
Kid 'n Play
Sheneneh Jenkins from Martin
Beetlejuice from The Howard Stern Show
Big Worm character from Friday
Usher's song Burn
Chris Rock
Jamie Foxx's role in Jarhead
Homey D. Clown from In Living Color
Lil Wayne's song Lollipop
Tyrone Biggums from Chappelle's Show
Kris Kross' famous 1992 hit song Jump
The famous "Life is like a box of chocolates" quote from Forrest Gump
Bruh-Man from the 5th floor on Martin
Chinese lady in the store from Don't Be a Menace to South Central While Drinking Your Juice in the Hood

On the Bow Wow Remix there are references to:
Chris Tucker in Friday
Evander Holyfield and his many children
James Earl Jones in Coming to America
Beetlejuice from The Howard Stern Show
E.T. phoning home
Don King Only in America
MMA Kimbo Slice
Omarion's Song "O"
T-Pain-Buy U a Drank
Jaws
Ronny Turiaf
D'Angelo's song "Untitled(How Does it Feel)"
Method Man
Krayzie Bone
Pretty Ricky
Mr. T
P. Diddy
Ying Yang Twins

Charts

Weekly charts

Year-end charts

References

2007 songs
2008 debut singles
Yung Joc songs
Southern hip hop songs
Jive Records singles
Zomba Group of Companies singles